Anatoliy Yurevich (born 12 August 1957) is a Belarusian football coach.

Career
His playing career ended at the age of 17 due to a serious injury. Between 1974 and 1989 he studied to be a professional football coach, while also gaining coaching experience in FShM Minsk, various local Belarusian football academies and Belarusian SSR youth national teams.

In 1990, he joined Vedrich Rechitsa. In 1991, he led the team to winning the Belarusian SSR First League (second tier league). From 1993 till 1997 he managed MPKC Mozyr, whom he led to promotion to the top level in 1995 and winning a double in 1996. He continued working with various Belarusian and former-USSR clubs during 90s, 2000s and 2010s with various degrees of success. From 2010 till 2014 he coached in Kazakhstan, where he managed several clubs and worked in Football Federation of Kazakhstan.

Yurevich has mentored several notable younger Belarusian managers, such as Oleg Kononov and Leonid Kuchuk, who both started their coaching careers as Yurevich's assistants.

References

External links
Profile at footballfacts.ru

1957 births
Living people
Belarusian football managers
FC Slavia Mozyr managers
FC Torpedo Minsk managers
FC SKVICH Minsk managers
FC Metalurh Zaporizhzhia managers
FC Gomel managers
FC Ordabasy managers
FC Atyrau managers
FC Zvezda-BGU Minsk managers
Belarusian expatriate football managers
Belarusian expatriate sportspeople in Ukraine
Expatriate football managers in Ukraine